The Amphitheatre Peaks are a group of peaks surrounding and extending to the east of Amphitheatre Lake, in the northwest part of Nye Mountains of Antarctica. They were photographed in 1956 from Australian National Antarctic Research Expeditions (ANARE) aircraft and visited in November 1958 by an ANARE airborne field party. They were named by the Antarctic Names Committee of Australia in association with Amphitheatre Lake.

References
 

Mountains of Enderby Land